Dawngate was a proposed multiplayer online battle arena video game developed by Waystone Games and published by Electronic Arts for Microsoft Windows. It was meant to be a free-to-play game likely to be supported by micro-transactions. News about the game began to leak during early-mid April 2013 with few details on mechanics, gameplay, or other elements. Testing period began on May 24, 2013, and the community beta was released on April 9, 2014. The open beta was released on May 19, 2014; on November 4, 2014, it was announced that because the beta was not shaping up as they had hoped, all development would stop and the game would be fully shut down in 90 days. In 2015, it became a registered trademark of EA. In June 2020 a development team of fans reached out to EA in a means to acquire the rights to the name to release their fan remake as "Dawngate". A Kickstarter has been set up as a means of gather part of the funds required to obtain the rights and bring it back to life.  Despite successfully raising the sought after funds, the project was abandoned when the cost to acquire the IP was determined to be prohibitively high.

Gameplay

Dawngate was a team-oriented game where a group of five players (shapers) work together to complete objectives and destroy the enemy nexus. Destroying the nexus would win the game for the team.

Shapers and their stats could be modified by players by choosing spells and items. Shapers also had access to wards that could be placed to provide vision to areas of the map for their team.

Minions
AI controlled minions assisted shapers in their objectives. They regularly spawned at the home location, marching down the lanes towards the enemy home. More powerful striders could also spawn.

Lanes
Dawngate maps contained two lanes. Each lane was controlled by three powerful bindings per side. Lines running the length of the lane informed players of the status of their bindings and enemy bindings.

Jungle
Surrounding the lanes was the jungle, a neutral area containing passive creatures. Just like minions and shapers, these creatures could be killed for vim. The jungle was also a way to cut across the map to other lanes - but players use this area to hunt each other as well.

Within the jungle were four Spirit Wells that passively gathered vim for each team. Also within the center of the jungle was the Parasite, a powerful creature not to be trifled with alone.

Roles
When starting the game and formulating a team, players could choose what roles they would like to provide. The role was not dependent upon shaper choice, though some shapers had an advantage in some areas. Role choice also provided role-specific benefits. Once players had chosen their shapers, final decisions could be made on what player would be assigned what role.

There were four roles: Gladiator, Tactician, Hunter, and Predator. Gladiators focused on killing lane minions. Tacticians focused on harassing enemy shapers. Hunters focused on killing creatures in the jungle. Predators focused on killing enemy shapers.

When choosing a role, players were also able to choose a loadout that granted additional passive bonuses.

References

External links
 

Multiplayer online battle arena games
Cancelled Windows games
Electronic Arts games
Free-to-play video games
Video games adapted into comics